Ganhuyag Chuluun Hutagt is a Mongolian businessman, public figure, and former Vice Minister of Finance of Mongolia. According to Richtopia, Ganhuyag's was among the top 2500 CEOs in the world in 2015.

Career 
Ganhuyag Chuluun Hutagt started his career in 1991 as a floor supervisor at the Mongolian Stock Exchange and moved on to engage in the family business a year later. He joined the Central Bank's Supervision Division after graduating from the Budapest University of Economic Sciences in 1997.

He then worked for UNDP’s MicroStart Project in 1998, initially as a Finance Manager and then as Operations Manager, before becoming founding Executive Director of Mongolia’s first non-bank microfinance company, XAC (Golden Fund for Development) in 1999.

At the initiative of Gan, as he is called internationally, XAC subsequently merged with another NBFI, USAID funded Goviin Ekhlel, to form XacBank, a commercial bank with a social and development mandate. Hutagt held the position of Chief Executive Officer of XacBank and its parent XAC-GE Group, from the founding in 2002 until 2009. He then led the international expansion effort of TenGer Financial Group (formerly XAC-GE Group), until he was appointed Vice-Minister of Finance of Mongolia in 2010. He resigned from office after his unsuccessful bid for a seat in Mongolia's Parliament in June 2012. He started in the position of the Executive Chairman of Ard Financial Group (former Equity Investment Trust LLC, or EIT) in August 2012 until August 2014 when he became the CEO of Ard Financial Group. He serves as Chairman of most subsidiaries of Ard Holdings, such as Ard Credit, Ard Insurance, Ard Securities, etc.

Ard Financial Group took part in the privatization of Mongol Post in 2016 and became 31 percent shareholder of Mongolia's postal network. Ganhuyag serves as non-executive director on the Board of Mongol Post listed on the Mongolian Stock Exchange under ticker MNP.

Ard Insurance (AIC) was IPOd in October 2018 and Ard Credit (ADB) went public in March 2019. Ard Financial Group became a publicly listed company through RTO in August 2019.

He initiated Investor Nation movement to promote wider public ownership of strategic assets in 2014 and came up with the term CryptoNation in 2017 leading a charge of Mongolia into blockchain and crypto space. He holds annual and biannual public forums under these names and has been promoting ArdCoin since 2018.

Hutagt coined the phrase 'Wolf Economy' to describe Mongolia's rapidly growing economy (similar to the 'tiger economies' in Southeast Asia) in 2009. The phrase got picked up and popularized in a Renaissance Capital report in the same year.

Public office
Hutagt served as Mongolia’s Vice Minister of Finance from 2010 - 2012.  He was a member of the Business Advisory Council to the President of Mongolia from 2005 to 2009 and has served as advisor to the Prime Minister of Mongolia on development and economic issues from 2009 to 2010.

Hutagt is member of the Mongolian People’s Party’s Governing Council, Baga Hural, since 2010. He served on several working groups of the Parliament to draft laws related to financial inclusion.  Hutagt is a founding Secretary General of the Mongolia Economic Forum and served as the Forum’s General Secretary from 2010 to 2012.  He has served as the honorary consul of Hungary in Mongolia from 2006 to 2010 and has been a lecturer at the Frankfurt School of Finance & Management’s MFI Management Summer Academy since 2004. He currently serves as the President of the CEO Club of Mongolia.

Social initiatives
In 2009, Hutagt was nominated to the World Economic Forum's Forum of Young Global Leaders and became the founding curator of the Ulaanbaatar Global Shapers community in 2011. He became a member of the World Economic Forum’s Global Redesign Initiative on Social Entrepreneurship in 2009. He also serves as the Country Chair of Global Dignity Day movement for Mongolia since 2010.

Hutagt was a pioneer of the financial cooperative movement in the 1990s and served on the Board of the Microfinance Center (MFC) in 2007 and on the Schwab Foundation's Global Agenda Council (GAC) on social entrepreneurship in 2009. He served as Executive Secretary of the National Coordinating Committee of the Year of MicroFinance and Entrepreneurship and was a focal person of the International Year of Microcredit (UN) for Mongolia in 2004 - 2005.  He was the initiator of the 11th MFC Conference of Microfinance Institutions in 2008 and co-founded the Global Alliance for Banking on Values in 2009.

In 2010, he was chosen as President of the Mongolian Students Union and served until 2012. He served as President of the Mongolian Basketball Association in 2013.  Hutagt has initiated numerous youth development and sports campaigns, often connected with environmental missions. He initiated the ‘Duulian-2020’ movement in 2006 to popularize football among the youth through a junior league involving all schools in Mongolia.  He is a member of the Rotary Club of Ulaanbaatar since 2001 and served as Member of the Board for the Open Society Foundations in Mongolia in 2001-2002. He serves on the Board of the Ulaanbaatar Chamber of Commerce since 2015.

In partnership with Mongol TV, Hutagt hosted the first season of The Apprentice Mongolia (based on the hit reality TV show format from the United States) in December 2020.

References

External links

Official
Ganhuyag Chuluun's personal website

Living people
Mongolian businesspeople
People from Ulaanbaatar
1973 births
Corvinus University of Budapest alumni